The Belgian motorcycle Grand Prix is a motorcycling event that was part of the Grand Prix motorcycle racing season from 1949 to 1990.

History
The first official Belgian grand prix was held in 1949, but non-championship races were held as far back as 1921.

Every Belgian GP was held at the Spa-Francorchamps circuit, with the exception of the 1980 season when the round moved to the Zolder circuit due to problems with the new asphalt at Spa-Francorchamps in 1979. After the problems were resolved, Spa-Francorchamps became the host again from 1981 onwards.

The last race was held in 1990, and was subject to controversy. At the time, the FIM–IRTA war was raging on, and the Belgian Grand Prix became a casualty of this. Bernie Ecclestone decided to double the ticket prices for the 1989 Belgian Grand Prix compared to the 1989 Dutch TT which was held a week earlier. This was much to the anger of the Belgian fans and as a result of this, many fans stayed at home for the 1990 Belgian Grand Prix. This drop in spectators, in combination with the race being held on a Saturday rather than a Sunday (which was similar to the Dutch TT at the time), caused the Belgian GP to be scrapped from the 1991 season onwards.

Future

Improvements to the circuit to make it suitable for motorcycle racing were made in autumn 2021 in time for the 2022 endurance season, and the Spa 24 Hours motorcycle race debuted at Spa in June 2022.  It is unknown if Spa or another Belgian circuit will apply for MotoGP.

Official names and sponsors
1949–1975: Grand Prix de Belgique des Motos/Grote Prijs van Belgie voor Moto's (no official sponsor)
1976-1978: Grand Prix Belgique/Grote Prijs Belgie (no official sponsor)
1979: G.P. Moto (no official sponsor)
1980, 1982: Grand Prix of Belgium (no official sponsor)
1981: Grand Prix Moto (no official sponsor)
1983: GP Johnson of Belgium
1984–1985: Johnson GP of Belgium
1986: GP of Belgium (not mentioned in the name but the race was sponsored by Johnson)
1988: GP of Belgium Gauloises Blondes
1989: Belgium Motorcycle Grand Prix (no official sponsor)
1990: Belgian Motorcycle Grand Prix (no official sponsor)

Formerly used circuits

Winners of the Belgian motorcycle Grand Prix

Multiple winners (riders)

Multiple winners (manufacturers)

By year
A pink background indicates an event that was not part of the Grand Prix motorcycle racing championship.

References

Sources

 

 
Circuit de Spa-Francorchamps
Recurring sporting events established in 1921
Recurring sporting events disestablished in 1990
1921 establishments in Belgium
1990 disestablishments in Belgium